Fitch may refer to:

Family name 
 Fitch (surname), family name of English origin

Places 
In Antarctica:
 Fitch Glacier

In Australia:
 Mount Fitch, Northern Territory, former uranium mining site

In the United States:
 Fitch Creek, Pennsylvania
 Fitch, North Carolina, unincorporated community
 Fitch H. Beach Airport, Charlotte, Michigan
 Fitch Senior High School, Groton, Connecticut
 Mount Fitch (Massachusetts), third-highest summit in Massachusetts
 YMCA Camp Fitch on Lake Erie, in Springfield, Pennsylvania; named after John H. Fitch

Businesses 
 Abercrombie & Fitch, clothiers
 Fitch, Even, Tabin & Flannery, Chicago's oldest law firm
 Fitch Ratings Inc., international credit rating agency
 Fitch, a label launched by Madonna (studio) in 2007; with a special focus on the bakunyū niche

Ships 
 USS Fitch (DD-462), US Navy destroyer
 USS Aubrey Fitch (FFG-34), U.S. naval ship

Heraldry 
 Fitch (or cross fitchy), a cross in heraldry where the lower part is shaped like a sword blade

Mathematics, logic and technology 
 Fitch-style calculus, method for constructing formal mathematical proofs
 Fitch's paradox of knowability, logical paradox which asserts that the existence of an unknown truth is unknowable
 Fitch Barrier, sand-filled plastic barrier used to cushion impacts on highways
 Fitch-Margoliash method, weighted least squares method for clustering

Animals and plants 
 Fitch, the European polecat (Mustela putorius), a ferret-like predatory mammal
 Fitch, a name for the spice kalonji, the seed of Nigella sativa (used in the King James's Version of the Bible)

See also
Fitchburg (disambiguation)
Fitchville, Connecticut